Veddel (BallinStadt) is a rapid transit station on the Harburg S-Bahn line and served by the trains of Hamburg S-Bahn. The railway station is located in the Veddel, Borough of Hamburg-Mitte, Hamburg, Germany. The station is managed by DB Station&Service, a subsiary of the German railway company Deutsche Bahn AG. The station is listed as a Halt point (Haltepunkt), a passenger stop situated on an open stretch of line, and lacking specific signals.

History
On 1 December 1897, the Cöln-Mindener Eisenbahn started its service on the Rollbahn line. In 1983 — after 10 years of construction, the first part of Hamburg's southern S-Bahn line from Central Station toward Harburg were completed and opened with the new Veddel station.

Layout
The station is not fully accessible for handicapped persons. Before 1983, the station building was a brick building with an island platform and one entrance. Since the new S-Bahn line, it has exits on both ends of an island platform and a simple flat roof.

Services

Trains
The rapid transit trains of the lines S3 and S31 of the Hamburg S-Bahn are calling the station.

Facilities at the station
There are no lockboxes and no personnel are attending the station, but there are SOS and information telephones, ticket machines, toilets and a small shop.

See also
List of Hamburg S-Bahn stations
Hamburger Verkehrsverbund (HVV)

References

External links

Hamburg S-Bahn stations in Hamburg
Buildings and structures in Hamburg-Mitte
Railway stations in Germany opened in 1897